Luisa Josefina Hernández (2 November 1928 – 16 January 2023) was a Mexican writer and playwright.

Hernández died on 16 January 2023, at the age of 94.

Works

Plays
 Aguardiente de caña, 1951.
 Botica modelo, 1954.
 Los frutos caídos, 1955.
 Los huéspedes reales, 1956.
 La paz ficticia, 1960.
 El orden de los factores, 1983.
 El amigo secreto, 1986.
 Carta de Navegaciones Submarina, 1987.
 Habrá poesía, 1990.
 Las bodas, 1993.
 Zona templada, 1993.
 Los grandes muertos, 1999-2001.
 Una noche para bruno, 2007.
 La fiesta del mulato, 1966. Translated by William I. Oliver as 'The Mulatto's Orgy', Voices of Change in the Spanish American Theater, Austin: University of Texas Press, 1971, pp.219-55

Novels
 Apocalipsis cum figuris, 1951
 El lugar donde crece la hierba, 1959
 Los palacios desiertos, 1963
 La cólera secreta, 1964
 El valle que elegimos, 1965
 La memoria de Amadís, 1967
 La Cabalgata, 1969
 Nostalgia de Troya, 1970
 Apostasía, 1978

Other
 Beckett. Sentido y método de dos obras, 1997.
 Una lectura de Yerma de Federico García Lorca, 2006.

References

1928 births
2023 deaths
Mexican dramatists and playwrights
Mexican women writers
National Prize for Arts and Sciences (Mexico)